Sayongsong is a traditional Filipino steamed rice cake from Surigao del Norte and other areas of the Caraga Region of northeastern Mindanao, as well as the southeastern Visayas (Bohol, Samar, Leyte) where it is known as sarungsong or alisuso. It is distinctively served in cone-shaped banana leaves. Sayongsong is a type of puto.

Sayongsong is can be time-consuming to make. It is made with equal parts of glutinous rice and regular rice. It traditionally uses pirurotong, a native deep purple glutinous rice, which gives it a striking blue to purple color, but other types of glutinous rice can also be used. The rice mixture is soaked for around 20 minutes. Roasted peanuts (surigao version) or grated young coconut (Visayas version) are then added and the whole mixture is ground into a smooth paste known as galapóng. Coconut milk sweetened with sugar is boiled separately for around 10 minutes then filtered and mixed with the galapóng. The galapóng is then cooked in a pan while constantly stirring. When it becomes very thick in consistency, a bit of calamansi juice is spritzed on the mixture. It is then allowed to cool and then poured into greased banana leaves shaped into a cone. The cones are then steamed for an additional 20 minutes.

The dish can be modified by adding other ingredients, like chocolate or strips of young coconut meat. The texture of sayongsong is very soft, reminiscent of both kalamay and puto. Sayongsong has a short shelf life and spoils after around a day, though it can be preserved for another day if chilled and placed in an airtight container. In Samar, sarungsong can also be cooked in shaved bamboo tubes that are then peeled open to eat.

See also
Moron
Suman
Palitaw
Bibingka
Pastil
Kakanin

References

Philippine desserts
Philippine rice dishes
Foods containing coconut
Rice cakes